Basthalapalli is a village in the Hosur taluk of Krishnagiri district, Tamil Nadu, India.

References

Villages in Krishnagiri district